Saint-Offenge-Dessus is a former commune in the Savoie department in the Rhône-Alpes region in south-eastern France. On 1 January 2015, Saint-Offenge-Dessus and Saint-Offenge-Dessous merged becoming one commune called Saint-Offenge.

See also
Communes of the Savoie department

References

Former communes of Savoie